This is a list of women photographers who were born in Austria or whose works are closely associated with that country.

C
 Claire Beck (1904–1942), Jewish photographer in Vienna, died in the Riga concentration camp

D
 Gerti Deutsch (1908–1979), Austrian-born British photographer, contributed to Picture Post

F
 Marina Faust (active since 1974), artist, photographer
 Trude Fleischmann (1895–1990), society photographer, business in New York from 1940
 Gustl French (1909–2004), Austrian-American printmaker and photographer

J
 Birgit Jürgenssen (1949–2003), photographer, painter, educator, specialized in feminine body art

K
 Dora Kallmus (1881–1963), fashion and portrait photographer
 Hella Katz (1899–1981), Jewish portrait photographer and photography instructor
 Anna Koppitz (1899–1989), artistic photographer
 Friedl Kubelka (born 1946), photographer, filmmaker

M
 Karin Mack (born 1940), photographic artist
 Lotte Meitner-Graf (1899–1973), black and white portraitist
 Margaret Michaelis-Sachs (1902–1985), Austrian-Australian photographer, remembered for portraits, 1930 landscapes of Barcelona and Krakow
 Inge Morath (1923–2002), Austrian-American photographer, worked for Magnum

P
 Hanna Putz (born 1987), artistic photographer

S
 Julia Spicker (active since 2009), portrait and fashion photographer
 Margherita Spiluttini (born 1947), architectural photographer
 Susanne Stemmer (born 1973), visual artist and photographer

See also
 List of women photographers

-
Austrian women photographers, List of
Photographers
Photographers